Olavi Mikael Heinonen (20 September 1921 – 19 May 1992) was a Finnish diver. He competed in the men's 3 metre springboard event at the 1952 Summer Olympics.

References

External links
 

1921 births
1992 deaths
Finnish male divers
Olympic divers of Finland
Divers at the 1952 Summer Olympics
Divers from Helsinki